Ola (Olakunle) Akinboboye is a Nigerian-American nuclear cardiologist.

Early life and education
Born in Nigeria,  Olakunle earned a medical degree from University of Ibadan College of Medicine (1984).  He moved to the  United States where he earned  an MBA and master's degree in public health from Columbia University.

Medical and Academic career
Olakunle  completed his internal medicine residency at the Nassau University Medical Center, and a cardiology fellowship at the State University of New York.  He went on to Columbia University Vagelos College of Physicians and Surgeons and completed another fellowship with dedicated training in nuclear cardiology and an advanced echocardiolography. He became an associate professor of clinical medicine at the Weill Medical College of Cornell University, New York. He is the medical director of Laurelton Heart Specialists P.C. and Strong Health Medical Group P.C., Rosedale, Queens.  He specializes in cardiac imaging, clinical hypertension, coronary artery disease and diabetes. He has been  listed among the top doctors in New York by prominent American medical publications.

Professional Medical Associations
He served on the International Board of Governors of the American College of Cardiology from 1997 to 2000.  He became the 14th national president of the Association of Black Cardiologists (ABC) which was established in 1974 to focus on the adverse impact of cardiovascular disease on African Americans.
He is a Fellow of the American College of Physicians.    Other memberships include:
American College of Cardiology
American Heart Association
International Society of Hypertension in Blacks
American Society of Nuclear Cardiology
Society for Cardiovascular Magnetic Resonance
Certification Board of Nuclear Cardiology

References

External links

Living people
University of Ibadan alumni
Nigerian cardiologists
Nigerian emigrants to the United States
State University of New York faculty
Columbia Business School alumni
Columbia University fellows
American people of Yoruba descent
American cardiologists
African-American academics
Cornell University faculty
Yoruba academics
Yoruba physicians
20th-century births
20th-century American physicians
21st-century African-American physicians
21st-century American physicians
Columbia University Mailman School of Public Health alumni
Fellows of the American College of Cardiology
Year of birth missing (living people)
20th-century African-American physicians